Sapahar Govt. College is a public educational institution based in Sapahar Upazila, Naogaon District, Bangladesh. It was established in 1973 with 15 students and currently serves about 4,000. It is situated at the north-east part of Sapahar and is authorized by the National University. It's the second largest institution in Naogaon District.
Sapahar Govt. College was nationalized in 1984.

See also
 Al-Helal Islami Academy & College, Sapahar, Naogaon
 Sapahar Pilot High School, Naogaon

References

External links
 Amardeshonline.com

Colleges in Naogaon District
Universities and colleges in Naogaon District
Educational institutions established in 1973
1973 establishments in Bangladesh